The word 'areae' is also the Latin plural of 'area'.

Areae is an American computer technology corporation located in San Diego, California, that was established in July 2006 by Raph Koster. Areae has been officially changed to Metaplace, Inc. to avoid confusion. Funded by Charles River Ventures and Crescendo Ventures, Areae develops the Metaplace software platform that democratizes the development of virtual worlds.

History
In January 2010, the company pivoted towards using its virtual worlds platform to build social games on Facebook. It released two successful games on Facebook using its platform, Island Life and My Vineyard, after which the company was acquired by Playdom.

References

External links
 Metaplace (official website)

Companies based in San Diego
Video game companies established in 2006
Metaplace
MUD organizations
Video game companies of the United States